Nyctemera undulata is a moth of the family Erebidae first described by Rob de Vos and Karel Černý in 1999. It is found on Mindanao in the Philippines.

References

 

Nyctemerina
Moths described in 1999